Raviv Weidenfeld (born 12 October 1970) is a former professional tennis player from Israel.

Biography
Born in Herzliya, Weidenfeld had a promising junior career, which included a win over Jim Courier. As a junior he competed in several grand slam events, twice making the round of 16, at the 1986 Wimbledon Championships and 1988 French Open.

Weidenfeld began competing professionally in the late 1980s and represented Israel once in a Davis Cup tie, a 1990 World Group relegation play-off at home against China. In the final reverse singles, Weidenfeld defeated Di Lin in straight sets, to complete a 5-0 whitewash. His ATP Tour main draw appearances came in four editions of the Tel Aviv Open and 1997 tournaments in Indianapolis and Tashkent. He won two Challenger titles, one in singles and one in doubles.

Challenger titles

Singles: (1)

Doubles: (1)

See also
List of Israel Davis Cup team representatives

References

External links
 
 
 

1970 births
Living people
Israeli male tennis players
People from Herzliya